STAP, or stap, may refer to:

Name
 List of people with the surname Stap

Science and technology
 Space-time adaptive processing, a signal processing technique
 Simple task-actor protocol, UI serialization spec for enabling symmetric sw access for AI and human users
 STAP1, a signal-transducing adaptor protein encoded by the STAP1 gene
 STAP2, a signal-transducing adaptor protein encoded by the STAP2 gene
 Stimulus-triggered acquisition of pluripotency, a proposed method of generating pluripotent stem cells
 SystemTap (stap), a Linux debugging utility

Other uses
 Scientific and Technical Advisory Panel, an arm of the Global Environment Facility and part of the UN Family of organizations 
 Single Trooper Aerial Platform, a fictional  Star Wars vehicle
 São Tomé and Príncipe, country's acronym name is STAP

See also
 Standard conditions for temperature and pressure (STP), a set of environmental parameters